Kerepesi Cemetery (Hungarian: Kerepesi úti temető or Kerepesi temető, official name: Fiumei úti nemzeti sírkert, i.e. "Fiume Road National Graveyard") is the most famous cemetery in Budapest. It is one of the oldest cemeteries in Hungary, and has been almost completely preserved.

Overview

Founded in 1847, Kerepesi is located in outer Józsefváros, near Keleti pályaudvar (Eastern Railway Station), and can be reached via Budapest Metro line 2. It is the innermost cemetery of Budapest, although it still lies about 2 km from the downtown centre. It is sometimes referred to as the Père Lachaise of Budapest.

The cemetery's first burial took place some two years after its opening, in 1849. Since then numerous Hungarian notables (statesmen, writers, sculptors, architects, artists, composers, scientists, actors and actresses etc.) have been interred there, several of them in ornate tombs or mausoleums. This was encouraged by the decision of the municipal authorities to declare Kerepesi a "ground of honour" in 1885. The first notable burial was that of Mihály Vörösmarty in 1855.

Until the 1940s, several tombs were removed to this cemetery from others in Budapest – for example, it is the fourth resting place of the poet Attila József.

The cemetery was declared closed for burials in 1952. This was partly because it had become damaged during World War II, and partly for political reasons, as the Communist government sought to play down the graves of those who had "exploited the working class". At one point it was intended to build a housing estate over the cemetery. Part of the grounds were in fact handed over to a nearby rubber factory and were destroyed in 1953.

In 1958, a Mausoleum for the Labour movement was created by Olcsai-Kiss Zoltán. During the Communist period (which lasted from 1948 till 1989 in Hungary) this was the only part of the cemetery highlighted or even mentioned by the authorities. After the fall of communism, Kerepesi was still considered by some as a Communist cemetery (for example a son of Béla Bartók forbade his father's ashes to be interred there).

The cemetery, with its  extended parks among the graves and monuments, is today open to the  public, but interments have ceased.

The Salgotarjani Street Jewish Cemetery is actually the eastern corner of the Kerepesi Cemetery, but it is separated from it by a stone wall.

In summer 2007, some of the filming for The Boy in the Striped Pyjamas (film)  was completed at the cemetery.

Special sections
In 1874, a special parcel was established for those who were denied a church funeral (those who committed suicide and those executed).

The cemetery is also famous for its arcades, built between 1908 and 1911, recalling the style of Northern Italian cemeteries.

The artists' sector – in which each tomb contains a notable Hungarian representative of the arts – was created in 1929.

Notable interments

Kerepesi contains three mausoleums of leading Hungarian statesmen:
 Lajos Batthyány
 Ferenc Deák (1876, designed by Kálmán Gerster, the stained glass by Miksa Róth)
 Lajos Kossuth (1894, Kálmán Gerster, sculptures by Alajos Stróbl)

There is also a notable mausoleum for Ábrahám Ganz (iron-founder, pioneer in Hungarian heavy industry), built to the plans of Miklós Ybl in 1868.

Other notables include:
 Endre Ady (poet)
 Ignác Alpár (architect)
 József Antall (Prime Minister, historian)
 János Arany (poet)
 Mihály Babits (poet)
 Béla Balázs (writer, film aesthete)
 Miklós Barabás (painter)
 Jenő Barcsay (painter)
 István Bethlen (Prime Minister)
 Lujza Blaha (actress, "the nightingale of the nation")
 Ottó Bláthy (electrical engineer)
 Ferenc Chorin (politician and industrialist)
 Adam Clark (civil engineer)
 Tivadar Csontváry Kosztka (painter)
 Gergely Czuczor (linguist, poet)
 Dezső Szabó (linguist, writer)
 Béni Egressy (composer)
 Loránd Eötvös (physicist)
 Ferenc Erkel (composer)
 János Fadrusz (sculptor)
 György Faludy (writer, poet, translator)
 Ferenc Fejtő (journalist, political scientist)
 Károly Ferenczy (painter, along with Béni Ferenczy and Noémi Ferenczy, his brother and sister)
 Zsa Zsa Gabor (actress, along with her mother) 
 János Garay (poet)
 Artúr Görgei (general)
 Alajos Hauszmann (architect)
 Jenő Heltai (writer)
 George de Hevesy (Nobel Prize winner chemist)
 Gyula Horn (Prime Minister)
 Miklós Izsó (sculptor)
 Mari Jászai (actress)
 Mór Jókai (writer, 1904)
 Attila József (poet)
 János Kádár (socialist dictator)
 Pál Kadosa (composer)
 Kálmán Kandó (inventor, engineer)
 Mihály Károlyi (President)
 Károly Mária Kertbeny (writer, translator, coined the words "heterosexual" and "homosexual")
 Géza Kertész (football player and manager, anti-fascist resistant - reburied 1946)
 Károly Kisfaludy (poet, dramatist, painter)
 Dezső Kosztolányi (poet, writer)
 Gyula Krúdy (writer)
 Ödön Lechner (architect)
 Lipót Fejér (mathematician)
 Károly Lotz (painter)
 György Lukács (philosopher)
 Viktor Madarász (painter)
 Ferenc Mádl (President, jurist)
 Ignác Martinovics (Franciscan, leader of the Hungarian Jacobin movement)
 Ferenc Medgyessy (sculptor)
 László Mednyánszky (painter)
 Kálmán Mikszáth (writer)
 Zsigmond Móricz (writer)
 Mihály Munkácsy (painter)
 Arthur J. Patterson (academic)
 Karl Polanyi (economist)
 Tivadar Puskás (engineer, inventor)
 Miklós Radnóti (poet)
 Frigyes Riesz (mathematician)
 Ignaz Semmelweis (doctor, "Saviour of Mothers")
 Imre Steindl (architect)
 Alajos Stróbl (sculptor)
 Antal Szerb (writer)
 Leo Szilard (physicist)
 Mihály Táncsics (writer, politician)
 István Tóth (football player and manager, anti-fascist resistant - reburial in 1946)
 Ármin Vámbéry (linguist)
 Mihály Vörösmarty (poet) – his tomb is one of the oldest extant tombs: he was interred in 1855
 Leó Weiner (composer)
 Sándor Wekerle (Prime Minister three times)
 Miklós Ybl (architect)
 György Zala (sculptor)
 Mihály Zichy (painter, graphic artist)

Note: This list is very far from complete. The full list of notable persons would include about 700 names. Their complete listing is available in a free booklet available at the cemetery.

See also
 Farkasréti Cemetery

Bibliography
 Lukacs Csernus and Zsigmond Triff, The Cemeteries of Budapest, Budapest, 1999.

Notes

Resources
  Múlt-kor article

External links
  Budapest Funeral Institute, including
 A slideshow of the most notable monuments
  an overview of the cemetery
 List of celebrities with biographies who rest in this cemetery (with pictures)
 Kerepesi Cemetery at Find a Grave
 Main graves in Kerepesi Cemetery
 Kerepesi Cemetery photo gallery

Cemeteries in Budapest
Religion in Budapest
1847 establishments in the Austrian Empire
Cemeteries established in the 1840s